Ciclometasone (brand names Cycloderm, Telocort) is a synthetic glucocorticoid corticosteroid which is marketed in Italy.

References

Amines
Carboxylic acids
Chloroarenes
Corticosteroid esters
Diketones
Glucocorticoids
Pregnanes
Triols